
 was an ancient Japanese custom usually practiced by young unmarried men and women. It was once common all over Japan and was practiced in some rural areas until the beginning of the Meiji era and even into the 20th century.

Description 
At night, young unmarried men would silently enter houses with young unmarried women. A man would silently crawl into a woman's room and make his intentions known. If the woman consented, they would sleep together. By the morning he would leave. The girl's family might know about it, but pretend they did not. It was common for young people to find a spouse like this.

According to ethnologist Akamatsu Keisuke, the practice varied from place to place. In some places, any post-puberty woman, married or unmarried, could be visited by any post-puberty man, married or unmarried, from the village and even by men from other villages and travellers. In other places, only married women and widows could be visited, while single girls could not. And there were variations; for example, the "closed type" yobai was a custom in which only men from the same village had the right of visitation.

See also 
 Night hunting, Nepal

References

Sources

 
 

Japanese traditions
Japanese folklore
Sexuality in Japan
Human sexuality
Night in culture
Sleep